Sarla Bhadauria (1921-2006) was an Indian politician. She was a Member of Parliament, representing Uttar Pradesh in the Rajya Sabha the upper house of India's Parliament as a member of the Samyukta Socialist Party.

References

1921 births
2006 deaths
Rajya Sabha members from Uttar Pradesh
Samyukta Socialist Party politicians
Women in Uttar Pradesh politics
Women members of the Rajya Sabha